Ansar, Al Ansar, or Al-Ansar may refer to:

Groups and organizations
 Al-Ansar (Iraq), a Communist guerrilla group in Iraq active from 1979 to 1988
 Ansar (Islam), citizens from Medina who helped Muhammad
 Ansar (military), a class of Arabian warriors
 Ansar (Sudan), a Sufi religious movement in the Sudan
 Ansar Brigade, a Syrian rebel group
 Bangladesh Ansar, an internal security force in Bangladesh

People
 Ansar, the nickname used by US President George W. Bush for José María Aznar, prime minister of Spain
 Ansar Burney, Pakistani-Arab human rights activists
Manny Ansar, founder-director of the Festival au Désert in Mali

Places

Iran
 Ansar, Hamadan, a village in Hamadan Province, Iran
 Ansar, North Khorasan, a village in North Khorasan Province, Iran
 Ansar Rural District, in West Azerbaijan Province, Iran

Other places
 Ansar, India, a village in Siwan district of Bihar, India
 Ansar, Kazakhstan, a rural locality in Akmola Region
 Ansar, Lebanon, a village in south Lebanon

Sports teams
Al Ansar FC, a Lebanese association football team
Al Ansar FC (women), a defunct Lebanese women's association football team
 Al Ansar Club (Libya), a Libyan association football team
Al-Ansar FC (Medina), a Saudi Arabian association football club
Al-Ansar (Saudi Arabia, basketball), a Saudi Arabian basketball team
Ansar Howara SC, a Lebanese association football team
Ansar Al Mawadda SC, a Lebanese association football team

Other uses
 Anshar, also spelt Anšar, an ancient Babylonian sky god

See also
 Ansar al-Islam, a Sunni Islamist group of Iraqis promoting a radical interpretation of Islam
 Ansar al-Sharia, a number of Islamist groups active in the Arab world
 Ansar-e Hezbollah, a militant conservative Islamic group in Iran
 Ansar al-Sunna (Mozambique), an Islamist militant group active in Cabo Delgado Province, Mozambique
 Ansar Dine, a Tuareg Islamist group, accused of having links with Al-Qaeda in the Islamic Maghreb and other Islamist groups
 Ansari (disambiguation)
 Ansaru, a Nigerian Islamist group, in conflict with the Nigerian state
 Ansarullah (Ahmadiyya), an auxiliary organization of the Ahmadiyya Muslim Community
 Anser (disambiguation)
 Jamaat Ansar al-Sunna, an Iraqi Sunni insurgent group that fought against US Troops and their local allies during the Iraq War
 Nuwaubian Nation, formerly the Ansaaru Allah Community, a black nationalist group in the US